Pantsing, also known as depantsing, debagging, dacking, flagging, sharking, and scanting is the pulling down of a person's trousers and sometimes also underpants, usually against their wishes, and typically as a practical joke or a form of bullying, but in other instances as a sexual fetish. The most common method is to sneak up behind the intended victim, grab the trousers at the waist, and apply a quick downward tug before the victim is aware of the assailant's presence.

Pantsing is a common type of prank or bullying in school gym classes. Its most extreme form includes running the trousers up the school flagpole. Some U.S. colleges before World War II were the scenes of large-scale "depantsing" scraps between freshman and sophomore males, often involving more than 2,000 participants. It is also an initiation rite in fraternities and seminaries. It was cited in 1971 by Gail Sheehy as a form of assault against grade school girls, which did not commonly get reported, although it might include improper touching and indecent exposure by the perpetrators. The United States legal system has prosecuted it as a form of sexual harassment of children.

Alternative names 
In Northern England the dialect renders the word "dekekking" or "dekecking" where "keks" is a local word for underwear.

The term double-dacking is used when both the pants and underwear are pulled down.

Another prank, in which the victim's underpants are yanked upward rather than downward is called a wedgie.

Bullying
Pantsing can be used as a form of bullying and is technically the crime of simple assault. The practice has been viewed as a form of ritual emasculation. In 2007, British Secretary of State for Education and Skills Alan Johnson, in a speech to the National Association of Schoolmasters Union of Women Teachers, criticized such bullying and criticized YouTube for hosting a movie (since removed) of a teacher being pantsed, saying that such bullying "is causing some [teachers] to consider leaving the profession because of the defamation and humiliation they are forced to suffer" and that "Without the online approval which appeals to the innate insecurities of the bully, such sinister activities would have much less attraction."

Juanita Ross Epp is highly critical of teachers who regard pupils pantsing one another as normal behavior, saying that pantsing makes pupils feel intimidated and uncomfortable and that "normal is not the same as right".

See also
 Kanchō

References 

Assault
Bullying
Practical jokes
Sexual harassment
Terminology of the University of Cambridge
Terminology of the University of Oxford
Sexual violence
Sexual fetishism